
Year 101 BC was a year of the pre-Julian Roman calendar. At the time it was known as the Year of the Consulship of Marius and Aquillius (or, less frequently, year 653 Ab urbe condita) and the Fourth Year of Taichu. The denomination 101 BC for this year has been used since the early medieval period, when the Anno Domini calendar era became the prevalent method in Europe for naming years.

Events 
 By place 
 Roman Republic 
 July 30 – Battle of Vercellae (Battle of the Raudine Plain or Battle of Campi Raudii): The Roman consuls Gaius Marius and Manius Aquillius defeat the Cimbri.

 Libya 
 Ptolemy Apion inherits the kingdom of Cyrenaica.

 Asia 
 War of the Heavenly Horses: Han general Li Guangli detaches forces to attack Yucheng. After a failed attack by Wang Shengshen and Hu Chongguo, in which Wang is killed, a new Han detachment under Shangguan Jie defeats and captures the king of Yucheng. The king is then killed by the soldiers escorting him to Li Guangli.
 Han-Xiongnu War: At the beginning of the year, Xulihu Chanyu dies from illness and is succeeded by Qiedihou Chanyu. Qiedihou releases the Han envoys detained by the Xiongnu and receives gifts from Emperor Wu of Han.

Deaths 
 Boiorix, king of the Cimbri (killed at the Battle of Vercellae)
 Cleopatra III, queen of the Ptolemaic Kingdom (assassinated by her son Ptolemy X Alexander I)

References